This is a list of films made by the British production company Gainsborough Pictures and its parent company Gaumont British between 1924 and 1950. The Gainsborough brand was first used in 1924, although several films had previously been made by the company's founders under a different name. Gaumont British, which took control of Gainsborough in the late 1920s, had also made films prior to 1924. After the merger, the companies released a single slate of films each year.

Following a financial crisis at the company in 1936, Gaumont British ceased production and concentrated on distribution. Despite this, films continued to be released under the Gainsborough banner. In its later years the company was part of the Rank Organisation; it was shut down by the Rank management in 1950 as part of an economy drive.

During the 1920s and 1930s the company took part in several co-productions with Continental companies, notably the German firm UFA. Other films were made by Gainsborough under contract for 20th Century-Fox. Also included are films made by Sydney Box's Triton Films.

1920s

1930s

1940s

1950s

See also
 List of Stoll Pictures films
 List of Ealing Studios films
 List of British and Dominions films
 List of British Lion films
 List of British National films
 List of Two Cities Films
 List of General Film Distributors films
 List of Paramount British films

References

Bibliography
 Cook, Pam. Gainsborough Pictures. Cassell, 1997.

Gainsborough Pictures films
Gainsborough Pictures